German submarine U-641 was a Type VIIC U-boat built for Nazi Germany's Kriegsmarine for service during World War II.
She was laid down on 19 November 1941 by Blohm & Voss, Hamburg as yard number 617, launched on 6 August 1942 and commissioned on 24 September 1942 under Oberleutnant zur See Horst Rendtel.

Design
German Type VIIC submarines were preceded by the shorter Type VIIB submarines. U-641 had a displacement of  when at the surface and  while submerged. She had two shafts and two  propellers.

U-641 was fitted with five  torpedo tubes (four fitted at the bow and one at the stern), fourteen torpedoes, one  SK C/35 naval gun, 220 rounds, and one twin  C/30 anti-aircraft gun. The boat had a complement of between forty-four and sixty.

Service history
The boat's short service career began on 24 September 1942 for training with 5th U-boat Flotilla, followed by active service on 1 March 1943 as part of the 7th U-boat Flotilla. It ended ten months later when she was sunk in the North Atlantic.

In four patrols she sank no ships.

Wolfpacks
U-641 took part in thirteen wolfpacks, namely:
 Neuland (4 – 6 March 1943)
 Ostmark (6 – 11 March 1943)
 Stürmer (11 – 20 March 1943)
 Seewolf (21 – 30 March 1943)
 Mosel (19 – 24 May 1943)
 Trutz (1 – 16 June 1943)
 Trutz 2 (16 – 29 June 1943)
 Geier 1 (30 June – 14 July 1943)
 Leuthen (15 – 24 September 1943)
 Rossbach (24 September – 9 October 1943)
 Borkum (18 December 1943 – 3 January 1944)
 Borkum 2 (3 – 13 January 1944)
 Rügen (13 – 19 January 1944)

Fate
U-641 was sunk on 19 January 1944 in the North Atlantic in position ; depth charged by Royal Navy corvette . There were no survivors.

References

Bibliography

External links

German Type VIIC submarines
1942 ships
U-boats commissioned in 1942
U-boats sunk in 1944
U-boats sunk by depth charges
U-boats sunk by British warships
World War II shipwrecks in the Atlantic Ocean
Ships lost with all hands
World War II submarines of Germany
Ships built in Hamburg
Maritime incidents in January 1944